Oil Springs Methodist Church is a historic church at the junction of KY 580 and KY 40 in Oil Springs, Kentucky. It was built in 1893 and added to the National Register in 1989.

It is a two-story frame church with a two-story pyramidal-roofed tower.  It was designed and built by Ben F. Mahan.  It was deemed notable as "Johnson County's best example of a late 19th century Gothic Revival frame church."

References

Methodist churches in Kentucky
National Register of Historic Places in Johnson County, Kentucky
Gothic Revival church buildings in Kentucky
Churches completed in 1893
19th-century Methodist church buildings in the United States
Churches in Johnson County, Kentucky
Churches on the National Register of Historic Places in Kentucky
1893 establishments in Kentucky